Washington Airlines is a defunct airline based in the United States The service was the FAA's first approved instance of a STOL airline service.

History 
Washington Airlines was founded to operate under a concept that STOL operations could enhance airport capacity without significant infrastructure costs. In 1968 Albert Scott Crossfield demonstrated the concept flying 160 operations between Boston, La Guardia and Washington National for Eastern Airlines. There was worldwide interest in the concept of STOL operations within cities with limited land for expansion. New York had $126 million planned for construction of STOL runways in 1970.

The company was founded by Butler Aviation International and Pan Maryland Airways. Butler had franchise rights to sell Dornier Do 28 aircraft in America, and chose the aircraft for their STOL service.  After five months in service between BWI, DCA and IAD the company was losing money with load factors of 20% and a total net loss of $100,000.
Washington Airlines ceased operations on 26 September 1969

Destinations 

Country/Continent
Baltimore, Maryland (BWI)
Washington D.C. (DCA)
Washington D.C. (IAD)

Fleet 
The AIRLINE fleet consists of the following aircraft as of 1969:

See also 
 List of defunct airlines of the United States

References

External links 
Image of a Washington Airlines Do-28

Defunct airlines of the United States
Airlines based in Maryland